Ćelije may refer to:

 Ćelije Monastery, located near Valjevo, Serbia
 Ćelije, Croatia, a village near Trpinja, Croatia
 Ćelije (Gadžin Han), a village in Serbia
 Ćelije (Kruševac), a village in Serbia
 Ćelije (Lajkovac), a village in Serbia
 Lake Ćelije, an artificial lake on the Rasina river in Serbia